Vincenzo Riccobono (1861–1943) was an Italian botanist, who researched extensively on cacti. He described the genus Trichocereus, now sunk into Echinopsis.

While collecting specimens in Libya in 1943, he was shot by American soldiers after running away from them at a security checkpoint.

References

19th-century Italian botanists
20th-century Italian botanists
1861 births
1943 deaths